is a 2008 Japanese action film written and directed by Shimako Satō and based on a novel by Sō Kitamura and its sequel. The film was released worldwide on December 20, 2008. Takeshi Kaneshiro and Takako Matsu portray a fictional role in the film. Tōru Nakamura and Kanata Hongo also starred in the film, just as Takeshi Kaga, Fumiyo Kohinata, Reiko Takashima, Toru Masuoka and Yuki Imai.

Plot
Set in a reality where Japan avoided World War II, by signing a peace treaty with the United States, the film takes place in Japan, 1949 in the capital of Teito.  There is a wide gap between the rich and the poor with aristocrats owning 90% of the wealth. The right-wing military–industrial complex have in fact developed a Tesla-style energy beam with the ability to cause Tunguska-style devastation. However, a mysterious masked thief dubbed "K-20"  (short for "Kaijin Nijū-Mensō" - the Phantom Thief with 20 faces), steals valuables from the rich and is considered a criminal.

One day, a circus acrobat named Heikichi Endo is assigned a task by a mysterious man with a scar on his face claiming and wearing a beige coat and to work for Kastori Magazine Heikichi to does the man's bidding to take photographs of duchess Yoko Hashiba and detective Akechi Kogoro's wedding by climbing up the outside of the building which is hosting the wedding but is arrested after an explosion leaving him to be arrested and question by Akechi. Later, an inmate gives Heikichi a description of what K-20's alleged face looks like bringing Heikichi to the realization that the man who claimed to work for Kastori Magazine was really K-20 in disguise and he has been set up to be K-20 by K-20 himself. Sometime later, Heikichi escapes the police vehicle transporting him to another prison and is taken into hospitality by the ringmaster of his circus, Genji, who turns out to be a thief. Heikichi trains to become a thief with the help of Genji and a book about disguises, for revenge on K-20.

Meanwhile, K-20 attempts to kidnap Akechi's fiancé, Yoko, but is stopped in his tracks by Heikichi, K-20 flees after hearing the police heading towards them, using a grappling hook, Akechi escapes with Yoko taking her back Genji's household. After discovering Heikichi wasn't K-20 during Heikichi's alleyway battle, Yoko attempted to convince Akechi that Heikichi isn't really K-20, while Heikichi and Genji attempt to steal a painting from Akechi's house but are unsuccessful. Akechi captures Heikichi and Genji and questions them in his lounge, Yoko tells her fiancé, his assistant, Heikichi, and Genji that the painting belonged to her grandfather who requested her to always keep it in her sight. They discover that the painting may have instructions for an electrical device known as the Tesla device, which can be used to supply power or as a destructive weapon. Genji tells them that the device needed to discover the weapon is at heavily armed police secured facility.

Akechi and Genji (disguised as an associate of his) enter the facility, but after setting off the laser alarm, the real Akechi enters the room telling the police that the man resembling him is none other than K-20 in disguise, removing his mask, Heikichi impersonating K-20, wearing a small mask over his eyes, a black cape, and hat revealed himself. While Heikichi distracts the police, the real Akechi and Genji use the laser-protected mission to scan the painting. Heikichi is shot at several times by the police unsuccessfully and Akechi's assistant detonates explosives killing several armed officers. Yoko saves Heikichi from the police by helicopter, fulfilling her ambition of flying.

Upon returning to Akechi's house with the scanned painting, they discover strange patines on the back of the artwork. Yoko finds that the Rubik's Cube-like object her grandfather gave to her was the key to activating the Tesla device. Akechi then finds a letter on his table from K-20 and is then shot, while his assistant and Yoko stay with him waiting for paramedics to arrive, Heikichi and Genji go to the building where Yoko and Akechi were to get married and find a small metal square on the floor, they place the Cube into the square, unleashing the Tesla device before they were too reactive the weapon, K-20 appears and knocking out Genji unconscious before battling Heikichi, who has the key to activate the Tesla device. During their fight, Heikichi strikes K-20 in the face removing his mask, leading Heikichi to discover K-20 is really Akechi. After Heikichi declines Akechi's offer of collaboration, Akechi attempts to activate the Tesla device and use it as a destructive weapon to destroy Teito and recreate it with him in power. However, while Heikichi and Akechi were in combating, Genji removed some of the device's wires, deactivating it. Genji and Heikichi then escape the building, while Akechi is killed in the blast, with Heikichi leaping out the window seconds before the building imploded, he is saved by Yoko once again flying a helicopter, she tells him that the reason for her delay was that Akechi drugged her.

Shortly thereafter, Heikichi becomes the new K-20.

Cast 
 Takeshi Kaneshiro
 Takako Matsu
 Tōru Nakamura
 Kyusaku Shimada
 Jun Kunimura
 Takeshi Kaga
 Kanata Hongō
 Jun Kaname
 Yutaka Matsushige
 Fumiyo Kohinata
 Reiko Takashima
 Toru Masuoka
 Hideji Otaki
 Hana Kino
 Kazuyoshi Kushida
 Yuki Imai
 Kisuke Iida

Music
Although a Japanese film, the final credits roll to the sound of "The Shock of the Lightning" by British band Oasis.

Poster

References

External links
  
 

2008 films
2008 action films
Japanese alternate history films
Japanese action films
2000s Japanese-language films
Films based on Japanese novels
Films directed by Shimako Satō
Nippon TV films
Films set in 1949
Films set in Tokyo
New People films
Toho films
2000s Japanese films